John Hodges Benwell (1764–1785) was an English genre painter, some of whose works became well known through engravings.

Life
Benwell was born at Blenheim Palace in Oxfordshire where his father was under-steward to  George Spencer, 4th Duke of Marlborough. He was a pupil of an obscure portrait painter called Sanders, who lived in Great Russell Street in Bloomsbury, London, but also studied at the  Royal Academy Schools, where he was awarded a silver medal in 1782. He later taught drawing at Bath, and executed a few small oval drawings  in a technique  which combined watercolour and pastel. His works have suffered much from the ravages of time.

He returned to London and exhibited a classical subject, Glycaera at the Tomb of her Mother, at the Royal Academy in 1784, but died of tuberculosis the next year, and was buried in Old St. Pancras churchyard.

Several of his works became well known from engravings. They included two scenes from "Auld Robin Gray"; the "Children in the Wood", engraved by William Sharp; and A St. Giles's Beauty and A St. James's Beauty, both engraved by Bartolozzi.

References

External links
Engraving after Benwell (Grosvenor Prints)

18th-century English painters
English male painters
English watercolourists
British genre painters
People from Woodstock, Oxfordshire
1764 births
1785 deaths
18th-century English male artists